Oktagon is an international martial arts tournament based in Northern Italy and founded in 1996 by Carlo Di Blasi. The annual Oktagon tournaments, which draw 14,000 spectators, are also broadcast on DMAX and Rai Sport television to 120 countries. Through 2015 (the 20th edition), the tournaments were held at the Mediolanum Forum in Assago, near Milan. In 2016, it was announced that the tournament's venue would move to the Pala Alpitour in Turin and be held jointly with the American MMA promotion organization Bellator.

Oktagon contestants have included Giorgio Petrosyan and his brother Armen Petrosyan.

Di Blasi, the founder and president of Oktagon, is also the founder of the  Italian martial arts organization Fight1. A member of the World MMA Association, the organization promotes Muay Thai, kick boxing and mixed martial arts events such as Oktagon and Thai Boxe Mania, as well as martial arts training.

References

External links
Oktagon official website
Fight1 official website

Martial arts organizations
Kickboxing events